Aspidiotes is a genus of weevils in the subtribe Tainophthalmina, described by Schönherr in 1847.

References

Entiminae
Curculionidae genera